La Magia de Tu Amor is a studio album released by Grupo Bryndis. All songs were composed by the group members. The last album with Guadalupe Guevara on vocals and Juan Guevara on drums.

Track listing

Grupo Bryndis albums
2008 albums